Rhubarb is a 1969 British short film written and directed by Eric Sykes, starring Sykes, Harry Secombe and Jimmy Edwards. The dialogue consisted entirely of repetitions of the word "rhubarb", all the characters last names were "Rhubarb", and even the number plates on vehicles were "RHU BAR B". A baby "spoke" by holding a sign with the word "Rhubarb" written on it.

"Rhubarb" is a radio idiom for unintelligible background speech.  Typically extras would mutter the word over and over to provide ambience for a crowd or party scene.  In The Goon Show the cast was usually only the three principals, who would pretend to try to sound like a larger group by repeating "rhubarb" very quickly but clearly, with outbreaks of "Custard!" for good measure.  Sykes was a close collaborator and friend of the Goons.  He remade the piece in 1980 for Thames Television, as Rhubarb Rhubarb.

Plot
A police inspector and a vicar play a round of golf. The inspector has a constable help him to cheat by removing his golf ball from awkward situations, and the vicar ultimately requests divine intervention.

Cast
Harry Secombe  ... Vicar Rhubarb
Eric Sykes  ... Police Inspector Rhubarb
Jimmy Edwards  ... Police Constable Rhubarb
Kenneth Connor  ... Mr Rhubarb
Ann Lancaster  ... Mrs Rhubarb
Hattie Jacques  ... Nurse Rhubarb
Anastasia Penington  ... Baby Rhubarb
Graham Stark  ... Golfer Rhubarb
Sheree Winton ... Lady Pupil Rhubarb
Gordon Rollings ... Artist Rhubarb
Johnny Speight  ... Gents Rhubarb

Critical reception
Allmovie wrote, "sight gags and pantomime dominate this engaging 37 minute feature."

See also
 Walla
 Rhubarb Rhubarb, the 1980 remake of Rhubarb.

References

External links
 
 Rhubarb at the BFI website

1969 films
1969 comedy films
Films directed by Eric Sykes
1969 short films
British comedy short films
1960s English-language films
1960s British films